Hercules is a 1907-built steam tugboat that is now preserved at the San Francisco Maritime National Historical Park in San Francisco, California.

History
Hercules was built in 1907 by John H. Dialogue and Sons, of Camden, New Jersey. She was built for the Shipowners' and Merchants' Tugboat Company of San Francisco, as part of their Red Stack Fleet (a part of today's Crowley Maritime Corporation). After completion, Hercules was sailed to San Francisco via the Straits of Magellan with her sister ship, Goliah, in tow.

For the first part of her life, Hercules was an oceangoing tug. Because of the prevailing northwest winds, sailing ships often employed Hercules and her sisters on journeys north up the coast from San Francisco. For example, in 1916, Hercules towed  to Port Townsend, Washington. On return trips back down the coast, Hercules often towed log rafts of Pacific Northwest timber, to Southern California mills. At other times, Hercules was employed towing barges to other ports on the West Coast and to Hawaii, and in transporting equipment for the construction of the Panama Canal.

In 1924, Hercules was acquired by the Western Pacific Railroad. For her new owners, she worked shuttling railroad car floats across San Francisco Bay from Oakland and Alameda to San Francisco.

In 1947, she and the tugboat Monarch were given the task of towing the hulk of the battleship  to San Francisco Bay to be scrapped. However, 500 miles from Hawaii, they were struck by a powerful storm and the Oklahoma began taking on water and sinking, threatening to drag the two tugs along with her. While the Monarch managed to release her lines, Hercules could not get free until the last moment, narrowly avoiding being dragged into the deep by the Oklahoma. Afterwards, she returned to shuttling car floats and worked in this role until 1957, when she was replaced by the diesel-powered train ferry . Hercules was kept in a stand-by role to the new ferry until 1961.

The California State Park Foundation acquired Hercules in 1975, and the National Park Service took over her restoration in 1977. In 1986 she was designated a National Historic Landmark. She is now one of the exhibits of the San Francisco Maritime National Historical Park and is to be found moored at the park's Hyde Street Pier.

Image gallery

References

Sources

External links

1907 ships
Tugboats of the United States
San Francisco Maritime National Historical Park
Museum ships in San Francisco
Western Pacific Railroad
steam tugs
Historic American Engineering Record in San Francisco
National Historic Landmarks in the San Francisco Bay Area
Ships on the National Register of Historic Places in California
National Register of Historic Places in San Francisco
Fisherman's Wharf, San Francisco
Rail transportation in Oakland, California
Ships built by Dialogue & Company